The Southeastern Louisiana Lions baseball team is a varsity intercollegiate athletic team of Southeastern Louisiana University in Hammond, Louisiana, United States. The team is a member of the Southland Conference, which is part of the National Collegiate Athletic Association's Division I. Southeastern Louisiana's first baseball team was fielded in 1947. The team plays its home games at Pat Kenelly Diamond at Alumni Field in Hammond, Louisiana. Since 2014, the Lions have been coached by head coach Matt Riser.

Year-by-year results

Major League Baseball
Southeastern Louisiana has had 45 Major League Baseball Draft selections since the draft began in 1965.

See also
 List of NCAA Division I baseball programs

References

External links
 

 
Baseball teams established in 1947
1947 establishments in Louisiana